Òlòturé is a 2019 Nigerian crime drama film directed by Kenneth Gyang from a screenplay by Yinka Ogun and Craig Freimond. It stars Sharon Ooja, Beverly Osu, Ada Ameh and Blossom Chukwujekwu.

Premise
Òlòturé tells the story of Òlòturé (Sharon Ooja), a young and naive Nigerian journalist who goes undercover to expose the dangerous and brutal underworld of human trafficking. Based in Lagos, it depicts how sex workers are recruited to be exploited overseas.

Cast
 Sharon Ooja as Òlòturé
 Beverly Osu as Peju
 Ada Ameh as Titi
 Omowumi Dada as Linda
 Blossom Chukwujekwu as Emeka
 Omoni Oboli as Alero
 Segun Arinze as Theo
 Adebukola Oladipupo as Beauty
 Ikechukwu Onunaku as Chuks
 Kemi Lala Akindoju as Blessing
 Omawumi as Sandra
 Sambasa Nzeribe as Victor
 Daniel Etim Effiong as Tony
 David Jones David as Sheriff
 Emmanuel Ilemobajo as Simon
 Eunice Omoregie as Linda's mother
 Gregory Ojefua as Sami
 Patrick Doyle as Sir Phillip
 Pearl Okorie as Peace
 Wofai Fada as Vanessa
 Yemi Solade as Jubril

Production
The script for Òlòturé is partly based on reporting by Nigerian investigative journalist Tobore Ovuorie. Filming officially began on November 5, 2018 at a location in Lagos, Nigeria.

Release
The film premiered on October 31, 2019 at Carthage Film Festival in Tunisia. In September 2020, Netflix acquired distribution rights to the film. Airing began on October 2, 2020. Within days after its release, Òlòturé ranged among the Top 10 watched movies in the world on Netflix.

See also
 List of Nigerian films of 2019

References

External links
 
 

2019 films
2019 crime drama films
English-language Netflix original films
English-language Nigerian films
Nigerian crime drama films
Films about human trafficking
Films about prostitution
Films about journalists
Films set in Lagos
Works about prostitution in Nigeria
2010s English-language films